Ghailene Khattali (born 17 June 2000) is a Tunisian sprint canoeist. He competed at the 2019 African Games and he won the gold medals in the C-1 200 metres and C-1 1000 metres events. He also won the bronze medals in the C-2 200 metres and C-2 1000 metres events, alongside Mohamed Kendaoui.

In that same year, he also competed in the men's C-1 200 metres, men's C-1 500 metres and men's C-1 1000 metres events at the 2019 ICF Canoe Sprint World Championships held in Szeged, Hungary. A year earlier, he competed in several events at the 2018 ICF Canoe Sprint World Championships held in Montemor-o-Velho, Portugal.

He competed in the men's C-1 1000 metres event at the 2020 Summer Olympics held in Tokyo, Japan.

References

External links 
 

Living people
2000 births
Place of birth missing (living people)
Tunisian male canoeists
African Games medalists in canoeing
African Games gold medalists for Tunisia
African Games bronze medalists for Tunisia
Competitors at the 2019 African Games
Canoeists at the 2020 Summer Olympics
Olympic canoeists of Tunisia
21st-century Tunisian people